Benito Ramos (born 26 March 1913, date of death unknown) was a Mexican épée, foil and sabre fencer. He competed at the 1948, 1952, 1956 and 1960 Summer Olympics.

References

External links
 

1913 births
Year of death missing
Mexican male épée fencers
Olympic fencers of Mexico
Fencers at the 1948 Summer Olympics
Fencers at the 1952 Summer Olympics
Fencers at the 1956 Summer Olympics
Fencers at the 1960 Summer Olympics
Sportspeople from Guadalajara, Jalisco
Pan American Games medalists in fencing
Pan American Games silver medalists for Mexico
Fencers at the 1951 Pan American Games
Medalists at the 1951 Pan American Games
Mexican male foil fencers
Mexican male sabre fencers
20th-century Mexican people